Founded in 1919, the American Classical League (ACL) is a professional organization which promotes the study of classical civilization at all levels of education in the United States and Canada.  Teachers of Latin, Ancient Greek and the Classics account for the majority of its membership, though the ACL is open to any person interested in preserving the language, literature and culture of both Ancient Rome and Ancient Greece.  Currently based in Hamilton, Ohio, the league publishes and provides hundreds of teaching aids; runs a national placement service for teachers of Latin and Greek; sponsors the National Latin Examination (NLE); functions as the parent organization of both the National Junior Classical League (NJCL) and National Senior Classical League (NSCL); and annually holds a convention — the Annual Institute — to promote excellence in the teaching of classical studies.  The ACL also encourages and supports ongoing dialogue with other classical and modern language associations.

Allied organizations 
Society for Classical Studies (APA)
American Council on the Teaching of Foreign Languages (ACTFL)
Archaeological Institute of America (AIA)
Classical Association of the Middle West and South (CAMWS)
Center for Hellenic Studies (CHS)

See also
National Latin Exam (NLE)
National Junior Classical League (NJCL)
Junior Classical League state chapters
Certamen (quiz bowl)
National Senior Classical League (NSCL)

Further reading

References

External links

National Junior Classical League
National Senior Classical League
National Latin Exam

 
Organizations established in 1919
Classical associations and societies
Academic organizations based in the United States
Pedagogy
Language education in the United States
Organizations based in Ohio
1919 establishments in the United States